Morlina glabra is a species of gastropods belonging to the family Oxychilidae.

Subspecies:
 Morlina glabra ercica (Benoit, 1859)
 Morlina glabra glabra (Rossmässler, 1835)
 Morlina glabra harlei (Fagot, 1884)
 Morlina glabra nitidissima (Mousson, 1859)
 Morlina glabra striaria (Westerlund, 1881)

Distribution 
This species occurs in:
 The Czech Republic
 Ukraine

References

 Rossmässler, E. A. (1835-1837). Iconographie der Land- & Süßwasser- Mollusken, mit vorzüglicher Berücksichtigung der europäischen noch nicht abgebildeten Arten. (1) 1 (1): VI + 1–132. pl. 1-5 
 Bank, R. A.; Neubert, E. (2017). Checklist of the land and freshwater Gastropoda of Europe. Last update: July 16, 2017

Oxychilidae